Veeranarayana Temple in Gadag city is a Hindu temple known to have been built around c.1117 by the Hoysala empire King Vishnuvardhana. Gadag city is the administrative headquarters of Gadag district in the state of Karnataka, India. The primary deity in temple is the Hindu god Narayana (also known as Vishnu). The Veeranarayana temple is a protected monument under the Karnataka state division of the Archaeological Survey of India.

History
History has it that Vishnuvardhana (originally known as Bitti Deva) was influenced by Ramanujacharya (or simply Ramanuja) when the saint cured a Hoysala princess of illness. Bitti Deva changed his name to "Vishnuvardhana", gave up his original faith Jainism, and became a Srivaishnava (a follower of a stream of the Vaishnava sect of Hinduism) and a devotee of Ramanujacharya. The king built five temples for the god Vishnu: the Veeranarayana temple at Gadag, the Nambinarayana temple at Tondanur, the Chennakesava Temple at Belur, the Kirtinarayana temple at Talakad and the Cheluvanarayana temple at Melkote. 34 medieval inscriptions have been discovered in Gadag, mostly within the premises of the two important temples in the town: the "Veeranarayana" and the "Trikuteshwara" temples. From these inscriptions there is ample evidence Gadag was a notable place of learning (maha-agrahara) administered by 72 mahajanas (maha meaning "important" and jana meanng "persons") during ancient times.

During the Vijayanagar empire era, according to the scholar D. Sheshagiri Rao, the notable Kannada poet Kumara Vyasa who called Gadag his home and the god Narayana (of Gadag) his favorite deity, wrote his Kannada version of the Hindu epic Mahabharata making adulatory references invariably to the deity of this temple at the end of each canto  (sandhi) . Legend has it that it was in this temple, at a particular pillar in the hall, that Kumara Vyasa accomplished the epic having received divine inspiration from his deity. An inscription of c.1539 inscribed during the rule of King Achyuta Deva Raya confirms a gift (Anandanidhi) given by the king to the temple.

Architecture and sculpture
The temple overall reflects multiple architectural idioms - Chalukya, Hoysala and Vijayanagara. The entrance mahadwara ("main entrance") and gopura ("tower") are in the  Vijayanagara style. This leads to a garuda stambha (lit, "eagle pillar") in the courtyard and the ranga mantapa ("gathering hall") which are in Hoysala style. The inner mantapa (hall adjoining the sanctum) is in the Chalukya style. The deity Veeranarayana (lit, "Brave Narayana") is depicted in a standing position, holding the attributes Conch (shanka), Wheel (chakra), Club (gadha) and Lotus (padma) in his four hands. The attire on deity (dhoti) is worn in a veera kaccha ("warrior style") giving the appearance of being "ready for battle". The deity is flanked by his consort Lakshmi and companion Garuda the eagle.

References

Gallery

12th-century Hindu temples
Hindu temples in Gadag district
Vishnu temples